A cameraman is a professional operator of a film or video camera.

It may also refer to:
The Cameraman, 1928 film by Buster Keaton
Cameraman: The Life and Work of Jack Cardiff, 2010 documentary about cinematographer Jack Cardiff
Cameraman (song), a song by the Field Music